Diane Jerome (born February 1, 1941) is an American sprint canoer who competed in the early 1960s. She was eliminated in the repechage of the K-2 500 m event at the 1960 Summer Olympics in Rome.

References
Sports-reference.com profile

External links

1939 births
American female canoeists
Canoeists at the 1960 Summer Olympics
Living people
Olympic canoeists of the United States
21st-century American women